Cardamyla eurycroca is a species of snout moth in the genus Cardamyla. It was described by Alfred Jefferis Turner in 1937. It is found in Australia.

References

Moths described in 1937
Pyralini